Hikitia is a working self-propelled floating steam crane in Wellington, New Zealand. She is thought to be the only working steam crane of her type in the world. She is also the sister ship to the Rapaki, formerly of the Port of Lyttelton, which was put on display at the New Zealand Maritime Museum after being taken out of service, and then scrapped in January 2019. Some parts from Rapaki were given to Hikitia.

Engines
Twin screws are driven by surface-condensing direct-drive compound engines which were supplied with steam by a coal-fired Scotch boiler with two furnaces. A similar but oil-fired boiler replaced the original boiler in 1963. In 1980 this was also removed and the present two locally made small modern package boilers were installed. These new boilers produce less steam than the original ones.

Crane
The hull of the vessel was built by Fleming & Ferguson and the crane was built by Sir William Arrol & Co. of Glasgow. The crane alone weighs 310 tonnes, and was built to lift 80 tonnes. However, while dismantling the wreck of  it is thought that she lifted 140 tonnes. In 2004 she lifted 100 tonnes to maintain her lifting licence of 80 tonnes. In 2009 Hikitia lifted a 22 tonne ice plant in Lyttelton.

Refurbishment
Hikitia travelled to Lyttelton in June 2009 for hull, tail shaft and various other underwater repairs. While in Lyttelton, she moved an ice plant between wharves to repay part of her refurbishment at the port's dry dock. The venture south was the ship's first time out of Wellington since 1926.

See also
 List of classic vessels
 List of museum ships

References

External links
Hikitia Heavy Lift Ltd
Crane Event from Heritage New Zealand, Autumn 2005
Maritime Archaeological Association of New Zealand
Hikitia official website

Steam cranes
Ships built on the River Clyde
Paisley, Renfrewshire
Buildings and structures in Wellington City
Merchant ships of New Zealand
Floating cranes
1926 ships